Launceston City Football Club is an Australian soccer club based in Launceston, Tasmania. The club was founded in 1957 and currently participating in the Tasmanian NPL Tasmania since 2013, run by the governing body Football Federation Tasmania. The club has over 100 registered players across senior, women and social leagues.

The junior club was briefly called "Westside Devils Soccer Club" from 1998 to 2016 and has since changed to Launceston City Devils. It has age groups from Under 6 to Under 16, and is one of the largest and most successful junior soccer clubs in the state with over 350 junior soccer players. The club also has a women's team which has been dominant since the turn of the century, picking up 9 Premier League titles and going unbeaten over four league seasons between 2005 and 2008.

History
Launceston City founded in 1957. City was particularly dominant in the 1960s, when they won every season except 1964. Although Northern Tasmania's most successful club with 19 Northern titles, they have failed to repeat their dominance of the 60s. The club uses the colours of Juventus and have links to the club.  Prior to the cessation of ethnic affiliations by Australian football clubs in 1997, Launceston City were known as Launceston Juventus.

In 1978 Launceston Juventus relocated from their home ground at Brooks High School to Buckby Motors Park located in Prospect Vale next to the Australian Italian Club where the club is still playing home games till this day. Buckby Motors Park has two playing grounds, fully functional floodlights for night games, clubrooms, change rooms.

Launceston City fields teams in the National Premier League Tasmania NPL, the second tier of Australian football, Northern Championship, Northern League 1, Under 18's and competes in the Northern Women's Championship Team this makes up over 100 senior registered players.

With regard to youth and juniors as of 2022, the club has over 450 players, compromising on 41 junior teams and over 100 enrolments in the fledging 'Juventus Academy'. 

Since 2018, a video of former goalkeeper Niko Giantsopoulos kicking the ball away prior to an opposition striker taking a penalty has been a regular viral video on social media. The move, designed to throw his opponent off balance psychologically just prior to taking the kick, resulted in Giantsopoulos being issued a yellow card, but the penalty went ahead. Giantsopoulos saved the goal.

Club Crest
Since Launceston City (Juventus) was founded in 1958 there has been four recorded club crests throughout the years.

First logo on record
The first ever recorded club crest since Launceston City's (Juventus) beginning in 1958 was this crest. Featuring the club's Italian heritage, resolve for success and the Launceston's coat of arms down the bottom of the crest. Which features with the two Tasmanian Tiger's holding the gold of the shield which refers to the early history of gold-mining in nearby hills. The blue represents the junction of the North and South Esk rivers where the city (symbolised by the gold central disc) was founded and the Tamar River flowing north to the Bass Strait. The club crest still features prominently outside the Launceston City change rooms to this day which was painted by life member Frank Stolp.

1980's

In the 1980s the club committee led by president and life member Ross Wesson formed a new design of the Launceston City (Juventus) club crest highlighting the club's relations to the club's Italian relations Juventus F.C. with the black and white stripes as seen on the club's home kits, the crest was used up until the early 2000s. The crest could be seen around Launceston in the form of stickers on motor vehicles and in the way of a keyring.

2008 to 2018

As part of the 50th anniversary celebrations the club began its sixth decade with a new logo created by David Jordaan. This logo pays homage to our Italian heritage with and was the first to feature the soccer ball in the centre of the crest as well as the ribbon at the base of the crest that marked its establishment of 1958.

Seasons - Men

Honours
 State Championships: (2) 1961, 1963
 State Championships Runners-up: (12) 1960, 1965, 1966, 1969, 1971, 1972, 1975, 1976, 1981, 1995, 2001, 2005
 Northern Premierships: (17) 1959, 1960, 1961, 1962, 1963, 1965, 1966, 1968, 1969, 1971, 1972, 1975, 1976, 1984, 1986, 2001, 2005
Cadbury Trophy : (1) 1979
Northern Knockout Cup : (2) 1964, 1971
Advocate Coca-Cola Night Soccer Series : (1) 1981
Statewide Cup: (5) 1966, 1976, 1991, 2004, 2007
Statewide Cup Runners-up: (6) 1964, 1977, 1997, 2002, 2005, 2006
Steve Hudson Cup: (9) 1987, 1989, 1991, 1993, 1996, 2002, 2004, 2005, 2007
Northern Women's Premier League: (12) 1987, 2001, 2002, 2005, 2006, 2007, 2008, 2009, 2010, 2011, 2012, 2013, 2016
Women's State Championship: (2) 2007, 2012
Women's Statewide Cup: (1) 2015

Individual honours
Men's State League Player of the Year
1986 –  Colin Guest
1987 –  Peter Savill
1989 –  Peter Savill
1994 –  Anthony Valentine

Men's State League Golden Boot
1981 –  Peter Sawdon (20)
Also Rothmans Medal winner ( State League Player of the year) 1985 and 1988 with George Town United. 

Women's State League Player of the Year
2017 –  Beth Bygrave

Northern Men's League Golden Boot
1969 –  Hans Streit (25)
2004 –  Alex Brownlie (14)
2005 –  Roger Mies

NPL Tasmania Rising Star Award
2017 –  Noah Mies

NPL Tasmania Goal of the Year
2018 –  Noah Mies

Northern Women's Best & Fairest
2005 –  Jill Couch
2013 –  Caitlin Storay
2014 –  Caitlin Storay
2015 –  Caitlin Storay

Northern Women's League Golden Boot
2005 –  Chelsea Smith

NPL TAS Coach of the Year
2015 –  Lino Sciulli
2022 –  Lino Sciulli

Office Holders

Life members

Senior Men - Honour List

Senior Women - Honour List

References

External links
Official Site

National Premier Leagues clubs
Soccer clubs in Tasmania
Association football clubs established in 1958
1958 establishments in Australia
Sport in Launceston, Tasmania
Italian-Australian backed sports clubs of Tasmania